Letolizumab (INN; development code BMS-986004) is a humanized monoclonal antibody designed for the treatment of inflammatory diseases.

This drug was developed by Bristol-Myers Squibb.

References 

Monoclonal antibodies